The 1982 Ancona Open was an ATP men's tennis tournament that was part of the Grand Prix circuit and was held in Ancona, Italy. The tournament ran from 15 November until 21 November 1982, and was played on indoor carpet courts. Third-seeded Anders Järryd won his 8th career title and his 6th title of the year by defeating Mike De Palmer in the final.

Finals

Singles

 Anders Järryd defeated  Mike De Palmer 6–3, 6–2

Doubles

 Anders Järryd /  Hans Simonsson defeated  Tim Gullikson /  Bernard Mitton 6–4, 6–3

References

External links
 ITF tournament edition details

Ancona Open, 1982
Tennis tournaments in Italy
1982 in Italian tennis